Tunisia competed at the 2011 World Aquatics Championships in Shanghai, China between 16 and 31 July.

Swimming

Tunisia qualified 4 swimmers.

Men

Women

References

Nations at the 2011 World Aquatics Championships
2011
World Aquatics Championships